Pickaboo.com is the largest omni channel platform in the country,  headquartered in Dhaka, Bangladesh. Pickaboo is registered under Silver Water Technologies Bangladesh Limited. The business started its operation on 15 May 2016. It has been retailing a wide range of electronic and lifestyle products such as - mobiles & tablets, desktop & laptop, home & kitchen appliances, gadgets, apparel, makeup, skincare, and accessories.

Pickaboo started its business as e-commerce marketplace back in 2016 with the strategic investment of Edison Group and MoMagic Technologies HK.

Platform 
Pickaboo is an omni-channel platform for mobile and gadgets.

Product category 
Pickaboo.com offers a variety of products like mobile phones, tablets, computers, electronics, home & kitchen appliances, lifestyle and digital products.

Marketing and campaign 
Pickaboo.com launched two marketing campaigns in 2016, one is online mobile fair and another one is online TV fair. Hero Bangladesh and Pickaboo signed an agreement for an exclusive online retail partnership in 2017.

References

Further reading

External links 
 Official website

Online retailers of Bangladesh
2016 establishments in Bangladesh
Bangladeshi brands